The Denver 2008 Convention Host Committee is a non-profit organization that was responsible for private funding of the 2008 Democratic National Convention in Denver, Colorado on August 25–28, 2008. In addition to securing sponsors, other obligations included organizing a volunteer base, managing a vendor database, coordinating local events, providing hospitality to delegates and credentialed media, and promoting tourism in Denver, Colorado and the Western United States.

As the fundraising arm of the convention, the Host Committee had four contractual partners: the Democratic National Convention Committee, which was responsible for logistics of convention activities within Pepsi Center; the City and County of Denver, which provided security, traffic management, and operational support; Kroenke Sports, owner of Pepsi Center arena where the convention was held; and its own Executive Committee.

Executive Committee Members 
The following individuals are listed on the inside cover of the Official 2008 Democratic National Convention Visitors Guide, produced by the Denver Metro Convention & Visitors Bureau.

The Hon. Elbra Wedgeworth, President of the Denver Host Committee
John W. Hickenlooper, Mayor of the City and County of Denver
Bill Ritter Jr., Governor of the State of Colorado 
United States Senator Ken Salazar
United States Representative Diana DeGette
Steve Farber, Attorney-At-Law 
Mike Dino, CEO of the Denver Host Committee

Host Committee Members 
The following individuals are listed on page 10 of the Official 2008 Democratic National Convention Visitors Guide, produced by the Denver Metro Convention & Visitors Bureau.

Jenny Anderson, Event Director, Host Committee
Katherine Archuleta, Mayor's Office, Senior Advisor on Policy and Initiatives
Christine Berg, Volunteer Director, Host Committee
Christina Beisel, Program Assistant for Greening, City and County of Denver
Mollie Brundage, Development Director, Host Committee
Parry Burnap, Greening Director, Host Committee
Sue Cobb, Communications Director, City and County of Denver
Trini Dominguez, Communications Assistant, Host Committee
Selena Dunham, Chief of Staff, Host Committee
Stephanie Foote, President, 2008 Rocky Mountain Roundtable
Germani Gonzales, Administrative Assistant, Host Committee
Rachel Gordon, Deputy Finance Director, Host Committee
David Kennedy, Disability Rights Coordinator, Host Committee
Betsy Kimak, Web Producer, Host Committee
Melissa Koenigsberg, Chief Financial Officer, Host Committee
Lindy Eichenbaum Lent, Senior Advisor to Denver Mayor John Hickenlooper, City and County of Denver
Paul Lhevine, Chief Operations Officer, Host Committee
Chris Lopez, Communications Director, Host Committee
Manjiri Mannino, Finance Assistant, Host Committee
Tyler Mounsey, Deputy Operations Director, Host Committee
Robin Pack, Accountant, Host Committee
Jim Polsfut, Chairman, 2008 Rocky Mountain Roundtable
Miranda Reeves, Events Assistant, Host Committee
Steve Sander, Marketing Director, City and County of Denver
Janet Schoniger, Director of External Affairs, Host Committee
Maryanne Talbott, Graphic Designer, Host Committee
Brent Tongco, Marketing/Communications Specialist, City and County of Denver
Latrisha Underhill, Operations Director, Host Committee
Chantal Unfug, Deputy City Liaison, Democratic National Convention, City and County of Denver
Tom Wagenlander, Deputy Volunteer Director, Host Committee
Sondra Williams, Volunteer Advisor, Host Committee

Economic Impact 
During the convention, more than 50,000 visitors came to Denver, including more than 16,000 members of the media, bloggers, and independent journalists. Early projections estimated an economic impact of $160–$200 million; however a final report released on October 16, 2008 by Denver Mayor John W. Hickenlooper put the official estimate at a $266.1 million regional economic benefit to the Denver metro region, of which $153.9 million occurred directly within the City and County of Denver.

Convention Greening 
One mission of the 2008 Denver Convention Host Committee was to ensure that the 2008 Democratic National Convention set a new standard for green conventions whereby sustainability and environmental health concerns are factored into the event planning. The Host Committee led this effort by setting green standards for events, completing environmental improvements at city facilities, setting up recycling areas, partnering with local restaurants and venues for healthy options, and encouraging the use of carbon offsets.

Fundraising Targets 
On October 16, 2008, the Denver 2008 Convention Host Committee announced that it generated just over $55 million in cash contributions and $5.46 million of in-kind support. The balance of the $60.9 million came from interest income and miscellaneous refunds. That surpassed the Host Committee's original $40 million contractual target by more than $20 million. In a 1,400-page Federal Election Commission report, the Host Committee detailed financial and in-kind contributions from more than 700 businesses and individuals.  Security-related expenses, not detailed in the report, were covered separately by a $50 million federal grant.

Volunteers 
An estimated 15,000 volunteers answered telephone calls, collated mailings, prepared and distributed convention materials, assisted at media and public events, and even collected and sorted trash at waste recovery stations for recycling and composting.

See also
2008 Democratic National Convention
City and County of Denver
John W. Hickenlooper

References

External links
 Official Denver 2008 Convention Host Committee Website
 City and County of Denver Website
 Denver Convention & Visitors Bureau Website

2008 Democratic National Convention